A "Palaeopascichnid" describes a multitude of elongate fossils made up of multiple sausage-shaped chambers. They appear only in Ediacaran sediments. Fossils of Palaeopascichnids consist of an occasionally branching series of globular or elongate chambers. These fossils started appearing in the Vendian (late Ediacaran) about 580 million years ago. Fossils of Palaeopascichnids are found in East European platform (White Sea, Urals, Moscow syneclise, Podolia, Finnmark), Siberia (Olenyok uplift, Uchur-Maya basin), South China (Lantian), Australia (Flinders Ranges), India (Tethys), Avalonia (Charnwood, Newfoundland)

Palaeopascichnid fossils are believed to be the first ever macroorganisms that show signs of an agglutinated skeleton.

Genera

Genera currently considered to belong to the group include:

 Genus Palaeopascichnus Palij, 1976
 P. delicatus Palij, 1976
 P. linearis Fedonkin, 1976
 P. gracilis Fedonkin, 1985

 Genus Orbisiana Sokolov, 1976
 O. simplex Sokolov, 1976
 O. intorta Kolesnikov & Desiatkin, 2022
 O. spumea Kolesnikov & Desiatkin, 2022

See also
 List of Ediacaran genera

References

Trace fossils
Ediacaran life
Ediacaran
Prehistoric animal genera
Fossil taxa described in 1972
Enigmatic prehistoric animal genera